The Eerste Nederlandse Systematisch Ingerichte Encyclopaedie (abbr. E.N.S.I.E., "First Dutch Systematically Arranged Encyclopaedia"), is a Dutch language encyclopaedia in ten volumes of which the first volume appeared in 1946 and the last part, the alphabetical lexicon, in 1952. It was published in Amsterdam under the redaction of Prof. Dr , Prof. Dr J. M. Romein, Prof. Dr H. A. Kramers, Dr  and others.

The volumes I through IX deal with various subjects in their context. The full size of the ten volumes measures around half a meter.

 Philosophy, religion, psychology, education (1946, Prof. Dr H. de Vos and Prof. Dr Ph. Kohnstamm)
 Linguistics, visual arts, music, performing arts (1947, Prof. Dr Anton Reichling S.J. and Jhr Dr J. S. Witsen Elias)
 History, sociology, cultural anthropology, sociography, economy, political science (1947, Dr H. A. Enno van Gelder, Prof. Dr J. P. Kruijt, Prof. Dr J. R. M. van den Brink, Prof. Mr J. Valkhoff)
 Mathematics, physics, chemistry, astronomy (1949, Prof. Dr J. A. Prins)
 Geodesy and cartography, geophysics, geology, oceanography, meteorology, biosphere, human geography (1948, Prof. Dr B. G. Escher and Prof. Dr A. N. J. den Hollander)
 Biology, anthropology, medicine, pharmacy (1949, Prof. Dr C. J. van der Klauw, Prof. Dr H. J. Lam and Prof. Dr G. O. E. Lignac)
 Veterinary medicine; agriculture; nutsbedrijven, traffic, publicity, radio, television, commerce, banking and insurance; statistics, management science, economical politics and social politics; planning (1950, Prof. Dr G. Krediet, Mr J. Baert, J A C. Bot and Prof. Dr S. Kleerekoper)
 Engineering (1950, Ir H. Steketee and Ir J. J. Ochtman)
 Civil engineering, arts and crafts, lifestyle and recreation, war and warfare, inventions and discoveries, scientific research (1950, J A C. Bot and Prof. Ir R. J. Forbes)
 Lexicon and index (1952, Dr W. Cahn)

Dutch encyclopedias
1946 non-fiction books
20th-century encyclopedias